Senator Goodman may refer to:

David Goodman (politician) (born 1967), Ohio State Senate
Jack Goodman (born 1973), Missouri State Senate
Roy M. Goodman (1930–2014), New York State Senate